Shawsville is an unincorporated community in Harford County, Maryland, United States.

References

Unincorporated communities in Harford County, Maryland
Unincorporated communities in Maryland